Kattath -, a town of Asher, has been identified with Kana el Jelil or Kithron. (See Cana)

References

Hebrew Bible cities